Sam Bonds Garage is a music venue and pub in the Whiteaker neighborhood of Eugene, Oregon, United States.  It has been voted as one of America's best bars by Esquire.

History
Sam C. Bond was the grandson of Eugene-area pioneers Allen and Rachel Bond, owners of a 320-acre donation land claim awarded in 1853 on the current site of the Eugene Airport. Bond operated a garage on Blair Street, constructed sometime between 1918 and 1923, although Bond purchased the property in 1926. Active in local politics, Bond served on the Eugene City Council from 1930 to 1942 and was credited in the site survey for the Eugene Blair Boulevard Commercial Area as having guided Eugene through the Great Depression. Bond retired from the garage in 1972.

The building became a Eugene night spot in 1995, when Sam Bond's Garage opened and began showcasing regional music talent.

Sam Bond's Radio
Sam Bond's Garage hosts a public playlist on Spotify called Sam Bonds Garage that features music by artists who are performing in upcoming shows.

References

External links 
 Sam Bond's Garage

Music venues in Oregon
Culture of Eugene, Oregon
Restaurants in Eugene, Oregon
Tourist attractions in Eugene, Oregon
Restaurants established in 1995
1995 establishments in Oregon